The Foothills Trail is a mostly paved non-motorized rail-trail in east Pierce County, Washington, extending uninterrupted for  from Puyallup, Washington through Orting and South Prairie, and terminating in Buckley.  The trail is used by cyclists, walkers, joggers, inline skaters, and horse riders.  Listed as Foothills Regional Trail, it was designated a National Recreation Trail in 2012.

Route
The trail begins in Puyallup and progresses to the community of McMillan. This portion of the route is paved and travels through farmland and is mostly separated from road traffic though the path twice crosses railroad tracks. The trail continues into downtown Orting, paralleling (but not on) Washington State Route 162, and passing through the city's Central Park. There are frequent views of Mount Rainier during this short section. The path advances on to South Prairie while overlooking the Carbon River during certain stretches. Passing wildlife viewpoints, the trail meanders into Buckley, the ending trailhead for the path.

Future plans
Longer-range plans call for the western end of the trail to extend through Sumner and connect with the Interurban Trail (King County) (which runs through Auburn, Washington and Kent, Washington) to Pacific, Washington and is planned to connect to existing segments in Edgewood and Milton, Washington. Construction began on a short segment in Fife, Washington.  The northeastern terminus is expected to eventually reach Enumclaw, Washington, while the southeastern end may go through Carbonado, Washington and extend to the entrance of Mount Rainier National Park.  Milestones along the trail count down the distance to the park.

References

External links
 Pierce County Foothills Trail
 Foothills Rails-to-Trails Coalition

Protected areas of Pierce County, Washington
Rail trails in Washington (state)
Transportation in Pierce County, Washington